Beinn a' Chlachair (1,087 m) is a mountain in the Grampian Mountains of Scotland. It lies south of Loch Laggan, near the remote hamlet of Kinloch Laggan.

The highest of a group of three Munros, the mountain has a spacious plateau on its summit, while three of sides are steep. There is a corrie on its northern face.

References

Mountains and hills of Highland (council area)
Marilyns of Scotland
Munros
One-thousanders of Scotland